Budge Patty defeated Frank Sedgman in the final, 6–1, 8–10, 6–2, 6–3 to win the gentlemen's singles tennis title at the 1950 Wimbledon Championships. Ted Schroeder was the defending champion, but decided not to play.

Seeds

  Frank Sedgman (final)
  Bill Talbert (quarterfinals)
  Jaroslav Drobný (semifinals)
  Eric Sturgess (quarterfinals)
  Budge Patty (champion)
  Gardnar Mulloy (quarterfinals)
  Art Larsen (quarterfinals)
  John Bromwich (fourth round)
  Geoff Brown (fourth round)
  Ken McGregor (fourth round)
  Bill Sidwell (fourth round)
  Vic Seixas (semifinals)
  Fred Kovaleski (fourth round)
  Irvin Dorfman (third round)
  Dilip Bose (second round)
  Giovanni Cucelli (withdrew)

Giovanni Cucelli withdrew due to injury. He was replaced in the draw by qualifier Athol Tills.

Draw

Finals

Top half

Section 1

Section 2

Section 3

Section 4

Bottom half

Section 5

Section 6

Section 7

Section 8

References

External links

Men's Singles
Wimbledon Championship by year – Men's singles